The Cottonwood Mountains are a mountain range in eastern Lassen County, California, near Nevada.

References 

Mountain ranges of Lassen County, California
Mountain ranges of Northern California